John Lowe (year of birth unknown – year of death unknown) was an English professional rugby league footballer who played in the 1930s.

International honours
John Lowe won caps for England while at Leeds in 1932 against Wales, in 1933 against Other Nationalities, and won a cap for Great Britain while at Leeds in 1932 New Zealand.

References

External links

England national rugby league team players
English rugby league players
Great Britain national rugby league team players
Rugby league hookers
Leeds Rhinos players
Place of birth missing
Place of death missing
Year of birth missing
Year of death missing